Salvia graciliramulosa is a shrub that is endemic to the Rio Chico valley of Bolivia, growing in red sandstone outcrops at  elevation, often growing in colonies on bare slopes.

Notes

graciliramulosa
Flora of Bolivia